Bulatov (masculine) or Bulatova (feminine) is a Russian surname. Notable people with the surname include:

Alexei Bulatov, Russian professional ice hockey forward
Andrei Bulatov (born 1978), Russian footballer and coach
Dmytro Bulatov (born 1978), Ukrainian activist, AutoMaidan's leader
Erik Bulatov (born 1933), Russian artist
Mikhail Bulatov (1760–1825), Russian military man
Rustem Bulatov (1974–2008)
Sergei Bulatov (born 1972), Russian footballer and coach
Viktor Bulatov (born 1972), Russian footballer

See also 
Bulatovich
Bulatović
Bulat

Russian-language surnames